Hummin' is an album by jazz cornetist Nat Adderley recorded in 1976 and released on the Dutch Little David label.

Reception 

The Allmusic review by Scott Yanow stated "somewhat dated and often a bit commercial; not one of Nat Adderley's more significant releases."

Track listing 
 "Hummin'" (Nat Adderley) – 5:22
 "Midnight Over Memphis" (John Stubblefield) – 5:06
 "The Traveler" (Cannonball Adderley, Nat Adderley, Diane Lampert) – 3:55
 "Theme from M*A*S*H (Suicide Is Painless)" (Michael Altman, Johnny Mandel) – 6:10
 "Listen to the Rain" (Onaje Allan Gumbs) – 6:55
 "Amor Soñador" (Stubblefield) – 7:00
 "Valerie" (Nat Adderley) – 7:56

Personnel 
Nat Adderley – cornet
John Stubblefield – tenor saxophone, soprano saxophone
Onaje Allan Gumbs – piano
Fernando Gumbs – bass
Ira Buddy Williams – drums
Victor See Yuen – congas, percussion

References 

1976 albums
Little David Records albums
Nat Adderley albums